This is a chronological list of Australian rules football clubs since their formation.

Note that some of these football clubs that formed before 1866 (see Laws of Australian football) may not have originally played the game known today as Australian rules football.  It is more than likely that most of these clubs were influenced the Melbourne Rules of 1859 which were the dominant rules of the day.  However many played by their own rules and often compromised rules when playing against other clubs.

Football clubs by date of establishment
 

* = defunct, disputed, poorly documented or dormant for a period.

References

External links

Date of establishment
 
History of Australian rules football